Shadman Town (Urdu:  شادمان  ) is one of the neighbourhoods of North Nazimabad Town in Karachi, Sindh, Pakistan. It is the Union Council 8 of North Nazimabad Town. Sector 14/A and Sector 14/B comprised this town. This town is planned as a residential area but due to increased population in and around this town, rapid commercialization has been witnessed in past decade. Many markets and bank branches are located here.

Town boundaries
Shadman is situated at the northwestern area of North Nazimabad Town. The town shares its boundaries with Block J of North Nazimabad in the south, North Karachi in the north, Sector 7/D (of North Karachi) in the west and the locality of Bufferzone in the east. The town is surrounded by big roads from all four sides: Sakhi Hassan roundabout in the south east, Nagan Interchange in the north east, Anda Mor in the north west and Qalandria Chowk in the south west.

Localities
Shadman Town's most popular flats are KDA flats, TNT flats and 1Postal Department Flats in front of Haroon Shopping Emporium and Maria Hill View Apartments in Sector 14-B near "Anda Mor". The tomb of famous Saint; Qalandar Baba Aulia is also located in this town. Children's Hospital and many schools are also located here. The Jamia Masjid Shadman is most popular masjid of this area.

References

Neighbourhoods of Karachi
North Nazimabad Town
Karachi Central District